Govenia superba is a species of orchid. Its natural range runs from central Mexico south to Honduras.

References 

superba
Orchids of Mexico
Plants described in 1825
Orchids of Central America